Seeley Greenleaf Mudd, M.D. (April 18, 1895 – March 10, 1968) was an American physician, professor, and major philanthropist to academic institutions.

Early life
Mudd was born in Denver, Colorado in 1895, and was the son of noted mining engineer Seeley W. Mudd and Della Mullock Mudd.  His brother, Harvey Seeley Mudd, was a miner, businessman, and philanthropist. He was eight when his family moved to Los Angeles, California. He attended Stanford University for two years before transferring to Columbia University, where he received a B.A in 1917 and a B.S. degree in mining engineering. He later attended Harvard Medical School where he received his M.D. degree in 1924.

Career
Dr. Mudd practiced cardiology in Los Angeles before joining the faculty at the California Institute of Technology, where he did work on cancer research. He was later professor and dean at the Keck School of Medicine of the University of Southern California.

Legacy
During his lifetime, Dr. Mudd contributed more than $10 million to private colleges and universities. Via his will, he created the Seeley G. Mudd Foundation to continue the work "that educational excellence be supported in the form of grants for the construction of buildings for teaching, learning, and research".

Many academic institutions have buildings named in honor of Mudd:

 Albion College: Seeley G. Mudd Learning Center
Amherst College: The Seeley G. Mudd Building
 Caltech: The Seeley G. Mudd Building of Geophysics and Planetary Sciences ("South Mudd")
 Carleton College: Seeley G. Mudd Hall of Science, which houses the chemistry and geology departments
 Cate School: Seeley G. Mudd Math Classroom Building and Seeley G. Mudd Science Building
 Chadwick School: Seeley Mudd Science Building
 Claremont School of Theology: Seeley G. Mudd Theater
 Colby College: Seeley G. Mudd Science Building
 Cornell University: Mudd Hall, the center for Neurobiology and Behavior
 Denison University: Seeley G. Mudd Learning Center, addition to William Howard Doane Library
 University of Denver:  Seeley G. Mudd Science building
 Duke University Medical Center: Seeley G. Mudd building 
 Harvard Medical School: Seeley G. Mudd building 
 Howard University: College of Medicine's pre-clinical science facility
 Johns Hopkins University: Seeley G. Mudd Science building
 Lawrence University: Seeley G. Mudd Library
 Lehigh University: Seeley G. Mudd Building of Chemistry
 Massachusetts Institute of Technology: Seeley G. Mudd Building 
 Northwestern University: Seeley G. Mudd Library for Science and Engineering
 Oberlin College: Seeley G. Mudd Learning Center
 Pacific School of Religion: Seeley G. Mudd building
 Pitzer College: Seeley G. Mudd Library (now part of the Honnold/Mudd Library)
 Polytechnic School: Seeley G. Mudd Science building
 Pomona College: Seeley G. Mudd Science Library
 Princeton University: The Seeley G. Mudd Manuscript Library
 Rice University: Seeley G. Mudd Computer Science Laboratory
 University of Southern California: The psychology and chemistry buildings; the medical research building on the health sciences campus
 Stanford University: Seeley G. Mudd Chemistry Building
 Vassar College: Seeley G. Mudd Chemistry Building, built in 1984
 Washington University in St. Louis: Seeley G. Mudd House residence hall, as well as the former Seeley G. Mudd Hall for the School of Law (an award-winning building for its use of concrete that ultimately proved unpopular with the University community, demolished 25 years after its 1972 dedication)
 The Webb Schools: Seeley G. Mudd Auditorium, remodeled and renamed in 2013.  
 Westridge School: Seeley G. Mudd Science Building
 Whitworth University: Seeley G. Mudd Chapel
 Willamette University: Seeley G. Mudd Building
 Yale University: Seeley G. Mudd Library

It is a common misconception that the Engineering building at Columbia University was also named for Seeley G. Mudd. It is, in fact, named for his father, Seeley Wintersmith Mudd.

References

External links
Short bio and picture of Dr. Seeley G. Mudd
Biography of Seeley G. Mudd from the Seeley G. Mudd Manuscript Library website at Princeton University
Whitworth University Campus Map

1895 births
1968 deaths
Columbia School of Engineering and Applied Science alumni
Harvard Medical School alumni
People from Denver
Physicians from California
Stanford University alumni
University of Southern California faculty
Stanford University trustees
20th-century American philanthropists
Columbia College (New York) alumni
Pomona College trustees
20th-century American academics